The Porsche Taycan is a battery electric saloon and shooting brake produced by German automobile manufacturer Porsche. The concept version of the Taycan, named the Porsche Mission E, debuted at the 2015 Frankfurt Motor Show. The Taycan was revealed fully production-ready at the 2019 Frankfurt Motor Show. As Porsche's first series production electric car, it is sold in several variants at different performance levels, and may spawn further derivatives in future models. More than 20,000 Taycans were delivered in 2020, its debut sale year, representing 7.4% of the total Porsche volume. A modified Taycan Turbo S is the current Formula E Safety car.

Nomenclature
The name "Taycan" (/taɪ-kɒn/) roughly translates from Turkish tay+can as "lively young horse", in reference to the steed of the Stuttgart coat of arms on the Porsche crest.

Porsche named the high performance models Turbo and Turbo S despite the absence of a turbocharger, following the tradition set by high performance Porsche derivatives with internal combustion engines.

Design

The Taycan's interior features Porsche's first fully digital instrumentation, with up to four digital displays, including a curved, free-standing  configurable driver's display. A  screen to the right of the instrument cluster is the car's infotainment center. An optional screen to the right of the infotainment screen allows the front passenger to customise the infotainment system. On the centre console, a  portrait-oriented, touchpad-controlled screen shows the powertrain's status and advises the driver on using the car's power efficiently. In contrast with the all-digital layout, the dashboard features the classic Porsche clock at its top.

The exterior styling, by former Porsche Exterior Designer Mitja Borkert, is strongly influenced by the Mission E concept car, retaining most of its design elements except the "suicide doors" and B pillars. Design features of the Taycan include a retractable rear spoiler, retractable door handles, and an advanced regenerative braking system. Taking full advantage of its drivetrain layout, the Taycan combines the fundamental short-nosed front proportions of traditional Porsches with the stretched proportions of modern front-engine models towards the rear, providing clear design links to existing models. The front features four-point LED daytime running headlamps. At the rear, the car has a short notchback-style boot lid, housing a full-width light band serving as taillights and turn signals and providing access to one of two luggage compartments. The other compartment is under the bonnet, with a claimed capacity of nearly 100 litres. The Taycan Turbo and Turbo S models include carbon-fibre trim and 20-inch wheels.

Taycan Cross Turismo 
The Taycan Cross Turismo is a lifted shooting brake/wagon version of the Taycan with additional body cladding, rugged black plastic trim, and other crossover-like features, including an off-road Design package and 'Gravel' drive mode.

Taycan Sport Turismo 
The Sport Turismo shares the estate/shooting brake profile with the Cross Turismo, but deletes the crossover-like styling elements. In addition, all Cross Turismo models are all-wheel-drive, while a RWD model is available for the Sport Turismo (as the base Taycan Sport Turismo).

Specifications

Chassis
The Taycan's body is mainly steel and aluminium joined by different bonding techniques. The body's B pillars, side roof frame and seat cross member are made from hot-formed steel, while the bulkhead cross member is made from boron steel to improve safety. The shock absorber mounts, axle mounts and rear side members are forged aluminum; and all body panels, except the front and rear bumpers, are also made from aluminum to reduce weight. 37% of the car is made of aluminium.

Powertrain
The Taycan uses a new battery-electric all-wheel-drive drivetrain with a permanent-magnet synchronous motor on each axle. At the front, power is sent to the wheels through a single-speed gearbox (8.05:1 gear ratio); and at the rear, through a two-speed transmission and a limited slip differential. The gearbox has a short planetary first gear (15.5:1) providing maximum acceleration, and a long-ratio second gear (8.05:1) delivering top speed and efficiency.

Power comes from a 93 kWh  lithium-ion battery pack that doubles as a structural chassis component and keeps the center of gravity low. To increase rear-seat legroom, recesses called "foot garages" have been incorporated in the battery pack. The 723-volt pack (835 volt full, 610 volt empty) has 33 modules with 12 LG Chem pouch cells each, for 396 cells in total.

At launch, the highest-output powertrains (Turbo and Turbo S) were available, distinguished by the larger inverter on the Turbo S. Later, the 4S powertrain was made available; output was reduced by switching to a less powerful rear motor, but the front motor was the same on all three (4S, Turbo, and Turbo S). A base model, which dropped the front motor and was fitted with a smaller 79.2 kW-hr battery, was introduced in early 2021. When the Cross Turismo body was introduced in March 2021, the base model was designated 4, which used the larger battery and two-motor all-wheel drive, but with outputs comparable to the rear-motor Taycan. As an option, the regular Taycan was fitted with the larger 93 kW-hr "Performance Battery Plus" in fall 2021 and a single-motor variant of the 4 Cross Turismo powertrain. The GTS powertrain was announced alongside the Sport Turismo body in November 2021; the GTS uses the larger battery and a more powerful set of motors to fill the gap between the 4S and the Turbo. The 4S Sport Turismo is fitted with the smaller battery as standard, but the larger battery is an option.

Notes

Range and charging
However, the car's range depends on how it is driven and what driving mode is selected. There are five driving modes: Sport, Sport Plus, Normal, Range, and Individual. The Range mode maximizes range with the lowest power consumption; and Individual lets the driver customise various settings. Regenerative braking provides up to 265 kW, yielding an acceleration of 0.39 G/-3.83 m/s^2.

Porsche has developed an 800-volt charging system specifically for the Taycan. The Taycan is also backward compatible with existing 400-volt stations up to  using an onboard step-up converter that converts the 400-volt system to the car's 800-volt system. Charge times depend on weather conditions and infrastructure. When purchasing a Taycan, owners receive three years free access to the speed-charging infrastructure of IONITY in Europe or Electrify America in the United States, Porsche's joint venture partners.

Unlike other electric vehicles, the Taycan has charging ports on both the driver's and passenger's sides. They cannot both be used simultaneously. For the European, American and other markets which use CCS, AC sources can be connected to either side and DC sources can only be connected to the passenger's side. For the Japanese and Chinese markets which use completely different AC and DC connectors, the driver's side contains the AC charging port and the passenger's side contains the DC charging port. To reduce charge times at both hot and cold temperatures, the battery can be thermally preconditioned using a charging planner. Owners set a departure time in the planner, and the car automatically warms or cools the battery for optimal charging times. A charging dock and mobile charger, supplied with the car for home charging, utilize a 9.6-kW connector that charges the car in 11 hours. An energy manager, which can also be installed in a home's circuit panel, can manage the house's power flow; provide cost-optimising charging using solar power; and provide blackout protection by reducing the charge to the car if household appliances such as fridges or dryers turn on and exceed the panel's power threshold.

Aerodynamics
The frontal area is 2.33 m2, with a resulting drag area of 0.513 m2 and 0.583 m2 for the Turbo and Turbo S, respectively.

Performance
Car and Driver did 15 consecutive quarter-mile runs in both the Taycan Turbo S and the 2020 Tesla Model S Performance to evaluate Porsche's claim that their car's performance holds up even as the battery discharges. Porsche's results during the test did not deteriorate significantly, while the Tesla's got considerably worse.

Models
The Taycan is currently offered as a 4-door saloon model and a 4-door estate model, the Taycan Cross Turismo. Other planned variants include a two-door coupe and convertible models, which will enter production based on market demand. Models introduced at launch include the high-performance AWD Turbo and Turbo S. The Taycan 4S, a mid-range AWD model with two battery sizes, was added in October 2019. The base RWD model was first announced in July 2020 for China, and then for Europe and US in January 2021. The GTS variants were announced in November 2021.

Notes: These power, torque and acceleration values were achieved with Overboost Power with Launch Control mode.

The Sport Turismo differs from the Cross Turismo as follows; "with the rear spoiler painted to match the body color and no cladding on the wheel arches. The Sport Turismo has the same silhouette as the Cross Turismo wagon and storage space. But it has the lower ride height of the Taycan sedan, giving it a racier, performance-minded look — and feel.", and as such is treated as a new body type.

Reviews and reception 
In December 2022, Bloomberg named the Taycan as an great other option to the Model X from Tesla for those frustrated by Elon Musk.

Awards 
In January 2021, the Taycan 4S was named Performance Car of the Year by What Car? magazine. What Car? awarded the Taycan five stars out of five in its review of the car.

In April 2021, the Taycan Cross Turismo was awarded Best Estate in the 2021 Top Gear Electric Awards.

Concept models

Porsche Mission E 
The concept car which previewed the Taycan was the Porsche Mission E, unveiled at the 2015 Frankfurt Motor Show. It is powered by two PSM permanently excited synchronous electric motors, one on each axle, with all four wheels individually controlled by the Porsche Torque Vectoring system.

The car's system voltage is 800 V DC. The batteries can be charged by an inductive plate or with a conventional charging system.

Porsche Mission E Cross Turismo
The Porsche Mission E Cross Turismo previewed the Taycan Cross Turismo, and was presented at the 2018 Geneva Motor Show. The design language of the Mission E Cross Turismo more closely resembles the Taycan than the Mission E. It combined the fully electric Mission E J1-platform with a 5-door estate body similar to the Panamera Sport Turismo, raised suspension, and off-road tyres and cladding to form a crossover utility vehicle. Porsche Chief designer Michael Mauer said the concept "shows possibilities of the future lineup." On October 18, 2018, the supervisory board of Porsche AG approved series production of the production-ready Porsche Taycan Cross Turismo.

References

External links

Official website

Production electric cars
All-wheel-drive vehicles
Cars introduced in 2019
Executive cars
Sports sedans
Station wagons
Taycan
2020s cars